Chilapa de Álvarez is one of the 81 municipalities of Guerrero, in south-western Mexico. The municipal seat lies at Chilapa de Álvarez. The municipality covers an area of 566.8 km².

The municipality has been heavily impacted by violence, and its municipal seat has been called "one of the deadliest towns" in Guerrero.

Demographics
As of 2005, the municipality had a total population of 105,146.

The year 2000 census counted 102,853 persons in the municipality.

Towns and villages 

 Chilapa de Álvarez
 Alcozacán 
 Zelocotitlán

References

Municipalities of Guerrero